Rosad Setiawan (born 9 August 1996) is an Indonesian professional footballer who plays as a midfielder for Liga 2 club Semen Padang.

Club career

Semen Padang
He was signed for Semen Padang to play in Liga 2 in the 2018 season.

Honours

Clubs
Semen Padang
 Liga 2 runner-up: 2018

References

External links
 Rosad Setiawan at Soccerway
 Rosad Setiawan at Liga Indonesia

1996 births
Living people
Indonesian footballers
Association football midfielders
Semen Padang F.C. players
Persibat Batang players
People from Agam Regency
Sportspeople from West Sumatra